This is a list of adult fiction books that topped The New York Times Fiction Best Seller list in 1968.

See also

 1968 in literature
 Publishers Weekly list of bestselling novels in the United States in the 1960s

References

1968
.
1968 in the United States